"Tempo Perdido" (Portuguese for 'lost time') may refer to:
 a song by Brazilian singer-songwriter Ataulfo Alves, covered by various artists including Pink Martini
 a song by Brazilian rock band Legião Urbana from their 1986 album Dois